Arvid Syrrist (13 March 1905 – 18 June 1997) was a Norwegian footballer. He played in five matches for the Norway national football team from 1924 to 1932.

References

External links
 

1905 births
1997 deaths
Norwegian footballers
Norway international footballers
Place of birth missing
Association footballers not categorized by position